Analytical and Bioanalytical Chemistry is a peer-reviewed scientific journal publishing research articles in the broad field of analytical and bioanalytical chemistry. Some of the subjects covered are the development of instruments for mass spectrometry, metallomics, ionics, and the analytical characterization of nano- and biomaterials. The journal was first published in 1862 under the name Fresenius’ Journal of Analytical Chemistry. In 2002 the journal was renamed to Analytical and Bioanalytical Chemistry.

Impact factor 
Analytical and Bioanalytical Chemistry had a 2018 impact factor of 3.286, ranking it 18th out of 84 in the subject category "Chemistry, Analytical" and 21st out of 79 in "Biochemical Research Methods".

Editors 
The editors of the journal are A.J Baeumner H. Cui, G. Gauglitz, G. Hopfgartner, L. Mondello, M.C. Moreno-Bondi, D.C. Muddiman, S. Szunerits, Q. Qang and S.A. Wise.

Literature 
 Wilhelm Fresenius: One hundred and forty years "Fresenius' Journal of Analytical Chemistry", in: Fresenius J Anal Chem (2001) 71:1041-1042

References

External links 

 Chemistry journals
Publications established in 1862
Springer Science+Business Media academic journals